The men's 800 metres at the 2012 European Athletics Championships was held at the Helsinki Olympic Stadium on 27, 28 and 29 June.

Medalists

Records

Schedule

Results

Round 1
First 4 in each heat (Q) and 4 best performers (q) advance to the Semifinals.

Semifinals
First 2 in each heat (Q) and 2 best performers (q) advance to the Final.

Final

References

Round 1 Results
Semifinal Results
Final Results

800
800 metres at the European Athletics Championships